Wendel Alex dos Santos, the Wendel born in Ribeirão Preto, is an attacking midfielder who plays for Mosta.

Career
is an attacking midfielder revealed in the basic categories of Atletico. It was a constant presence on the lists of call for selections based on both the juvenile and the junior. Silver Cock's house, the player was responsible for scoring the goal title in Cup campaign BH, 2009. On the occasion, Zico beat Inter by 1-0. Her professional debut took place in the team next year, on June 3, the match being valid for the Brazilian Championship.

Career statistics
(Correct )

Contract
 Atlético Mineiro.

References

External links
Galo Digital 
WebSoccerClub 

1991 births
Living people
Brazilian footballers
Clube Atlético Mineiro players
Paraná Clube players
Brazilian expatriate footballers
Association football midfielders
Association football forwards
Expatriate footballers in Malta
Maltese Premier League players
Mosta F.C. players
People from Ribeirão Preto
Footballers from São Paulo (state)